The 2003 Torneo Descentralizado (known as the Copa Cable Mágico for sponsorship reasons) was the eighty-seventh season of top-flight Peruvian football. A total of 12 teams competed in the tournament, with Sporting Cristal as the defending champion. Alianza Lima won its twentieth Primera División title after beating Sporting Cristal in the final playoff.

Changes from 2002

Structural changes
Starting in the 2003 season, half-year champions had to finish in the top six of each tournament to dispute the national title instead of the top four. A Copa Sudamericana qualifying round was disputed between the top four of the Torneo Clausura. No relegation took place at the end of the season due to a player's strike during the Clausura. The player's strike also caused an international qualifying round be played between the top five of the aggregate table who had not already qualified to an international tournament for 2004.

Promotion and Relegation
Juan Aurich and Coopsol Trujillo finished the 2002 season in 11th and 12th place, respectively, on the three-season average table and thus were relegated to their regional leagues. They were replaced by the champion of the 2002 Copa Perú Atlético Universidad and the 2002 Segunda División champion Unión Huaral.

Teams

Torneo Apertura

Copa Sudamericana 2003 qualifying

First leg

Second leg

Cienciano and Alianza Lima qualified to the 2003 Copa Sudamericana, which Cienciano went on to win.

Torneo Clausura
A strike by professional players cut the Clausura short. Most matches of Rounds 16 and 17 were played with under-20 and amateur players, but were later annulled. These are not included in the table below.

Final playoff

While not officially the Clausura champions because of the strike, Alianza Lima was leading the tournament, as well as the aggregate table, so a final playoff against the Apertura winners Sporting Cristal was held in January 2004, once the strike was called off.

Title

Aggregate table

2004 international qualifying
After the strike was called off in January 2004, it was decided that, since the tournament had not been completed, a qualifying tournament would decide the allocation of the third Peruvian berth for the Copa Libertadores 2004. The tournament was to include four teams, in principle from the third to the sixth teams according to the aggregate table. But since Cienciano had played one match less and would have surpassed Unión Huaral had they won it, a preliminary playoff was held between them. Sport Boys withdrew from the tournament in disagreement with the decision. Had the Clausura Rounds 16 and 17 not been annulled, the team would have been third in the aggregate table, and could have claimed the remaining berth. Also, some teams saw the tournament as a way to favor Cienciano, who had just won the Copa Sudamericana 2003, to give them a chance at representing Peru at the Copa Libertadores.

Qualifying preliminary

Qualifying group

Top goalscorers
20 goals
 Luis A. Bonnet (Sporting Cristal)
19 goals
 Pedro García (Alianza Atlético)
17 goals
 Sergio Ibarra (Estudiantes, Unión Huaral, Cienciano)
15 goals
 Paul Cominges (Universitario de Deportes)
14 goals
 Carlos Orejuela (Sport Boys)

External links
Peru 2003 season Details on RSSSF

Peruvian Primera División seasons
Peru
Primera Division Peruana